Arvid Andersen (1909 – 31 October 1970) was a Danish violinist, conductor, and composer.  He was the son of the writer Olaf Andersen, and composed, among other things, a concerto for his own instrument and a Capriccio for piano.

Male composers
Danish conductors (music)
Male conductors (music)
Danish classical violinists
Male classical violinists
1909 births
1970 deaths
20th-century classical violinists
20th-century Danish composers
20th-century conductors (music)
20th-century Danish male musicians